The 2017 European Junior Swimming Championships (50 m) were held from 28 June–2 July 2017 in Netanya, Israel. The Championships were organized by LEN, the European Swimming League, and were held in a 50-meter pool. The Championships were for girls aged 14–17 and boys age 15–18.

Results

Boys

Girls

Mixed events

Medal table

References

External links 
 
Results
Results book

European Junior Swimming Championships
European Junior Swimming Championships
International sports competitions hosted by Israel
European Junior Swimming Championships
Swimming in Israel
Sport in Netanya
Junior Swimming Championships
July 2017 sports events in Europe
Swimming